Kembé Falls (also known as the Kotto Falls) are located on the Kotto River, near Kembé on the road from Bangui to Bangassou in the Central African Republic, located about 80 km from Bangassou. Located some 3km from the town of Kembé, they are undeveloped and a regular stopping point for overland travelers.

References

Landforms of the Central African Republic
Waterfalls of Africa
Basse-Kotto